Matthias Wagner (or Matze) is a German programmer who has created utilities for games made by Westwood Studios, Electronic Arts and Petroglyph.

Westwood Studios
FinalSun
FinalSun is an advanced map editor for Tiberian Sun.

FinalAler
FinalAlert is a map editor for Red Alert 2 that went through numerous revisions. First came FinalAlert, developed independently by Wagner. It was later replaced by FinalAlert 2, a collaboration between Wagner and Westwood Studios, which was in turn upgraded to FinalAlert 2 Yuri's Revenge to allow support for Yuri's Revenge - this version was still an official utility. Wagner later released a tweaked version which had some bug fixes and included tunnels - leftover code from Tiberian Sun - although this version was no longer classed as an official Westwood utility.

Electronic Arts

FinalBIG
FinalBIG is a utility for the modification of BIG files used by Command & Conquer: Generals and BFME.

Petroglyph
FinalBIG for Empire at War
This version of FinalBIG now includes support for MEG files used by Empire at War.

External links
Official Website
Matthias Webpage
Matze speaks on FinalAlert 2

Living people
Year of birth missing (living people)